Naimur Rahman Durjoy (born 19 September 1974) is a Bangladeshi politician and retired cricketer. He is the incumbent Jatiya Sangsad member from the Manikganj-1 constituency representing the Bangladesh Awami League party since 2014.

Durjoy served as the first captain of Bangladesh national cricket team. At international level, he played 8 Test and 29 ODI matches for the team.

Cricket career
A right arm offspinner, Durjoy was a member of Bangladesh's 1997 ICC Trophy winning side. He became his country's inaugural Test captain when he led Bangladesh on their Test debut, against India in 2000. Rahman took 6 for 132 in India's first innings, including the wickets of Sachin Tendulkar and Sourav Ganguly. However a loss of form saw him lose the captaincy the following year and also his spot in the side.

After retirement, Durjoy became the president of the Cricketers' Welfare Association of Bangladesh.

See also
 List of Bangladesh cricketers who have taken five-wicket hauls on Test debut

References

External links

1974 births
Living people
Bangladeshi cricketers
Bangladesh Test cricket captains
Bangladesh One Day International cricketers
Bangladesh Test cricketers
Dhaka Metropolis cricketers
Dhaka Division cricketers
Cricketers at the 1998 Commonwealth Games
Cricketers at the 1999 Cricket World Cup
Cricketers who have taken five wickets on Test debut
Bangladeshi cricket coaches
Awami League politicians
10th Jatiya Sangsad members
Recipients of the Bangladesh National Sports Award
11th Jatiya Sangsad members
Commonwealth Games competitors for Bangladesh
People from Manikganj District